Podisus sagitta is a species of predatory stink bug in the family Pentatomidae. It is found in the Caribbean Sea, Central America, North America, and South America.

References

External links

 

Asopinae
Articles created by Qbugbot
Insects described in 1794